Charlotte Farr (born 15 September 1988) is a Scottish woman cricketer. She was part of the Scottish cricket team in the 2008 Women's Cricket World Cup Qualifier.

References

External links 
 
 

1988 births
Living people
Scottish women cricketers
Scotland women One Day International cricketers